Bardeh Gureh (also Romanized as Bardeh Gūreh; also known as Bard-e Kūr) is a village in Mangur-e Gharbi Rural District, in the Central District of Piranshahr County, West Azerbaijan Province, Iran. At the 2006 census, its population was 114, in 16 families.

References 

Populated places in Piranshahr County